Israel-Monaco relations refer to bilateral ties between the State of Israel and Principality of Monaco. Israel is accredited to Monaco from its embassy in Paris, France, and has a consul in Monaco. Monaco has a consul resides in Ramat Gan.

Overview 
The State of Israel and the Principality of Monaco officially established their relations in 1964. Monaco recognizes Israel only and has no relations to the PLO. By 2020, Monaco had the highest ratio of Jews outside of Israel.

Economic relations 
The relations between Israel and Monaco are based on tourism. In 2012, Israel exported goods worth 1,000 USD.

See also  
 Foreign relations of Israel
 Foreign relations of Monaco

References 

Monaco
Bilateral relations of Monaco